NYK Vega is a container ship, operated by Nippon Yusen Ship Management. The vessel has a capacity of 8,600 containers in company calculations and 9,012 TEU  in International Maritime Organization calculations. The difference comes from the use of a different method of stowing in checking the ship's stability.

Design 
The deadweight tonnage of NYK Vega is about 94,000 metric tons and the gross tonnage of the ship is 97,825. She sails under the Panamanian flag.

Bridge equipment 
Navigation is carried out using two electronic charts which integrate GPS, dGPS, AIS and ARPA, which usually allows the position of the ship to be plotted with an accuracy of 100 meters.  NYK Vega’s computers also assist in the efficient loading and unloading of the cargo and containers.

References

External links
Nippon Yusen

Container ships
Ships of the NYK Line
Merchant ships of Panama
2006 ships
Ships built by Hyundai Heavy Industries Group